The 1989 Tour de France was the 76th edition of Tour de France, one of cycling's Grand Tours. The Tour began in Luxembourg with a prologue individual time trial on 1 July and Stage 10 occurred on 11 July with a mountain stage to Superbagnères. The race finished on the Champs-Élysées in Paris on 23 July, with a further individual time trial.

Stage 11
12 July 1989 — Luchon to Blagnac,

Stage 12
13 July 1989 — Toulouse to Montpellier,

Stage 13
14 July 1989 — Montpellier to Marseille,

Stage 14
15 July 1989 — Marseille to Gap,

Stage 15
16 July 1989 — Gap to Orcières-Merlette,  (ITT)

Stage 16
18 July 1989 — Gap to Briançon,

Stage 17
19 July 1989 — Briançon to Alpe d'Huez,

Stage 18
20 July 1989 — Le Bourg-d'Oisans to Villard-de-Lans,

Stage 19
21 July 1989 — Villard-de-Lans to Aix-les-Bains,

Stage 20
22 July 1989 — Aix-les-Bains to L'Isle-d'Abeau,

Stage 21
23 July 1989 — Versailles to Paris Champs-Élysées,  (ITT)

Departing from Versailles, the route passed through Chaville, Sèvres and Issy-les-Moulineaux, before the intermediate timecheck and then entering Paris and crossing to the Rive Droite. The route entered the Champs-Élysées via the Cours-la-Reine and the Place de la Concorde, heading up the Champs-Élysées and returning down the other side, just before the Arc de Triomphe.

The time trial was the first and, so far, only to have ever finished on the Champs-Élysées at the end of a Tour de France.

LeMond's time trial bike was set up with a 54-tooth chainring on the front and a 12-tooth gear as the fastest on the rear cogset, as well as the triathlon bars he had used in the Stage 5 and Stage 15 time trials, and a rear Mavic disc wheel. Meanwhile, Fignon rode with the same rear gear, but a 55-tooth front ring, no triathlon bars, and with front and rear disc wheels. LeMond used an aerodynamic helmet, whilst Fignon rode without a helmet and wore a long ponytail. Fignon also had a saddle sore and had little sleep the night before.

With the weather hot, dry and still, LeMond departed from the starthouse in Versailles at 4:12 p.m. CEST, and Fignon two minutes later. LeMond requested that his support crew did not provide him with his intermediate times, or details of Fignon's progress, so that he could give total concentration to his own ride. By the  timecheck, LeMond was 21 seconds up on Fignon, for the stage. LeMond averaged  along the course, which was a Tour de France time trial record at the time.

References

1989 Tour de France
Tour de France stages